Anda or ANDA may refer to:

Places

China
Anda, Heilongjiang, a city in Heilongjiang, China
Anda railway station, a railway station in Anda, China

Iran
Anda, Iran, a village in Fars Province, Iran

Norway
Anda, Norway, an island in Øksnes municipality, Nordland county, Norway
Anda lighthouse, a lighthouse in Anda, Norway

Philippines
Anda, Bohol, a municipality in Bohol province, Philippines
Anda, Pangasinan, an island municipality in Pangasinan province, Philippines

People
 Altan Khan, Mongolian khan whose given name was Anda
Anda (singer), South Korean singer
Anda (surname)

Other
Aṇḍa, a concept in Kaśmir Śaivism
Abbreviated New Drug Application (ANDA)
Asociación Nacional de Actores (ANDA) or National Association of Actors, the Mexican actors guild
Anda, a Mongolian term for friends and allies who are "as though born from the same womb," i.e., “blood brothers." The term is also a word for "friend" in the Mongolian language
Anda (play), a 2008 Israeli play